The 2019–20 Honduran Liga Nacional season was the 54th Honduran Liga Nacional edition since its establishment in 1965.  The tournament started in July 2019 and ended in March 2020.  The season was divided into two halves (Apertura and Clausura), each crowning one champion.  A new format will be used starting this season, each club plays the others twice (a double round-robin system), once at their home stadium and once at that of their opponents', for 18 games.  The first five teams will advance to the post-season (Pentagonal), where they will play each other once.  If the same team wins both phases, they will be crowned champions automatically; otherwise, a final series will be scheduled between the winners of both phases.  This format was last used in 1992–93.  At the end of the season, the three teams with the best record will qualify to the 2020 CONCACAF League.

Following the 13th matchday on 15 March 2020 the Clausura tournament was suspended due to the COVID-19 pandemic in Honduras. On 29 April the tournament was officially cancelled with no champion declared and no team relegated.

2019–20 teams

A total of 10 teams will contest the tournament, including 9 sides from the 2018–19 season plus C.D. Real Sociedad, promoted from the 2018–19 Liga de Ascenso.

 C.D. Real de Minas is from Tegucigalpa but will play at Danlí.
 Lobos UPNFM is from Tegucigalpa but will play at Choluteca.

Managerial changes

Apertura
The Apertura tournament was  the first half of the 2019–20 season which ran from July to December 2019.  On 10 November, C.D. Olimpia secured their third straight spot in the final series after defeating C.D. Marathón 1–0 at Tegucigalpa.  Olimpia, Marathón, F.C. Motagua, Lobos UPNFM and C.D.S. Vida advanced to the Pentagonal stage.  After seven tournaments, Olimpia was able to stop the drought and won the Apertura tournament after winning both the regular season and post-season.

Regular season

Standings

Results

Postseason

Standings

Results

Final
The final series were scheduled to be played between the winners of the regular season and the Final 5 Stage (Pentagonal).  Since C.D. Olimpia won both phases, no finals were necessary.

Clausura
The Clausura tournament was the second half of the 2019–20 season which runs from January to March 2020.

Regular season

Standings

Results

Postseason

Results

Top goalscorers
The top goalscorer will be determined by the addition of goals of both Apertura and Clausura tournaments.

 As of 15 March 2020

 23 goals:

  Juan Mejía (Real de Minas)

 17 goals:

  Jorge Benguché (Olimpia)

 15 goals:

  Roberto Moreira (Motagua)
  Jerry Bengtson (Olimpia)

 14 goals:

  Franco Güity (UPNFM)

 13 goals:

  Justin Arboleda (Marathón / Olimpia)

 11 goals:

  Bruno Volpi (Platense / Marathón)

 10 goals:

  Rony Martínez (Real España)

 9 goals:

  Josué Villafranca (Vida)
  Mario Martínez (Marathón)
  Carlo Costly (Marathón / Platense)
  Carlos Discua (Marathón)

 8 goals:

  Jamal Charles (R. España / R. Sociedad)

 7 goals:

  Marcelo Estigarribia (Motagua)
  Alexander Aguilar (Platense / Vida)
  Jhow Benavídez (Real España)
  Kevin López (Motagua)
  Diego Reyes (Platense)

 6 goals:

  Eddie Hernández (Olimpia)
  Kílmar Peña (UPNFM)
  Edwin Solano (Marathón)
  Carlos Meléndez (Vida)
  Matías Garrido (Olimpia)
  Darixon Vuelto (Real España)

 5 goals:

  Frelys López (Marathón)
  José Pinto (UPNFM / Olimpia)
  Jeancarlo Vargas (Platense)
  Ilce Barahona (Platense)
  Rubilio Castillo (Motagua)

 4 goals:

  Jerrel Britto (Honduras Progreso)
  Aldo Oviedo (Real de Minas)
  Óscar Móvil (Real Sociedad)
  Matías Galvaliz (Motagua)
  Esdras Padilla (Vida)
  Marco Vega (Motagua)
  Kervin Arriaga (Marathón)
  Árnold Meléndez (UPNFM)
  Iván López (Real España)
  Yerson Gutiérrez (Marathón)
  Delis Vargas (Real España)
  Gonzalo Klusener (Motagua)
  Jesse Moncada (Real de Minas)

 3 goals:

  Joshua Nieto (Platense)
  Mathías Techera (Vida)
  Júnior Lacayo (Olimpia)
  Kemsie Abbott (Real Sociedad)
  Éver Alvarado (Olimpia)
  Ángel Rodríguez (Vida)
  Ronal Montoya (UPNFM)
  Denis Meléndez (Vida)
  Esteban Espíndola (Marathón)
  Osman Melgares (Real Sociedad)
  Rafael Agámez (Honduras Progreso)
  Jeison Mejía (Real Sociedad)

 2 goals:

  Sergio Peña (Motagua)
  Winston Mezú (Platense)
  Edder Delgado (Honduras Progreso)
  Mikel García (Real España)
  Ronaldo Dinolis (Real España)
  Devron García (Real España)
  Evgeni Kabaev (Real de Minas)
  Brayan Beckeles (Olimpia)
  Juan Montes (Motagua)
  Franklin Morales (Honduras Progreso)
  Michaell Chirinos (Olimpia)
  Marvin Bernárdez (Vida)
  Félix Crisanto (Motagua)
  Ángel Tejeda (Real España)
  Carlos Pineda (Olimpia)
  Nicolás Lugli (Platense)
  Davis Argueta (Honduras Progreso)
  Marlon Ramírez (H. Progreso / Marathón)
  Reinieri Mayorquín (Motagua)
  Carlos Sánchez (Vida)
  José García (Real de Minas)

 1 goal:

  Cristian Maidana (Olimpia)
  Selvin Guevara (Real España)
  Marcelo Pereira (Motagua)
  Ángel Velásquez (Platense)
  Marcelo Canales (Vida)
  Deyron Martínez (Real Sociedad)
  Allans Vargas (Real España)
  Franklin Flores (Real España)
  Sebastián Colón (Real de Minas)
  Denil Maldonado (Motagua)
  Jesús Rivera (Vida)
  Pedro Mencía (Honduras Progreso)
  Axel Gómez (Olimpia)
  Víctor Moncada (UPNFM)
  Mayron Flores (Marathón)
  Júnior Padilla (UPNFM)
  Luís Meléndez (Vida)
  Sony Fernández (UPNFM)
  Emilio Izaguirre (Motagua)
  Carlos Róchez (Marathón)
  Erick Peña (Honduras Progreso)
  Kendrick Cárcamo (Real Sociedad)
  Danny Mejía (Real Sociedad)
  José Reyes (Olimpia)
  Horacio Argueta (Vida)
  Dennis Lagos (UPNFM)
  Edwin Rodríguez (Olimpia)
  Gerson Rodas (Honduras Progreso)
  Rody Meléndez (Real España)
  Julio Moncada (Platense)
  José López (Marathón)
  Jeffry Miranda (Marathón)
  Aldo Fajardo (Platense)
  Jonathan Ferrari (Olimpia)
  German Mejía (Olimpia)
  Wilmer Crisanto (Motagua)
  Juan Delgado (Honduras Progreso)
  Samuel Elvir (UPNFM)
  Samuel Lucas (Honduras Progreso)
  Carlos Perdomo (Marathón)
  Wilmer Fuentes (Real Sociedad)
  César Guillén (Vida)
  Luis Palma (Vida)
  Yaudel Lahera (Honduras Progreso)
  Darwin Andino (Real de Minas)
  Jorge Claros (Real España)
  Jeffri Flores (Platense)
  Cristian Alessandrini (Vida)
  Bayron Méndez (Real Sociedad)
  José Cañete (Olimpia)
  Pedro González (Olimpia)
  Henry Figueroa (Marathón)
  Jorge Saldívar (Honduras Progreso)
  Hilder Colón (Honduras Progreso)
  Joshua Vargas (Platense)
  Víctor Araúz (Platense)
  Santiago Correa (Real España)
  Deybi Flores (Olimpia)
  Óscar García (Real de Minas)
  Diego Rodríguez (Real de Minas)
  Carlos Lanza (Vida)
  Sendel Cruz (UPNFM)
  Dábirson Castillo (Platense)
  Ted Bodden (UPNFM)
  Luís Guzmán (Real de Minas)

 1 own-goal:

  Wisdom Quaye (Vida)
  Azmahar Ariano (Marathón)
  Lesvin Medina (UPNFM)
  Carlos Meléndez (Vida)
  Sony Fernández (UPNFM)
  Kevin Espinoza (Marathón)
  Henry Ayala (Platense)
  Ronal Montoya (UPNFM)
  Raúl Santos (Motagua)

Aggregate table
Relegation will be determined by the aggregated table of both Apertura and Clausura tournaments.

External links
 LNP Official

References

Liga Nacional de Fútbol Profesional de Honduras seasons
Liga Nacional
Honduras
Honduras